Oxford-University Stadium at Swayze Field is the home of the University of Mississippi Rebels college baseball team, the 2022 NCAA National Champions, and is located in Oxford, Mississippi.  It is named in honor of Tom Swayze, a former Ole Miss baseball player and coach.

The $3.75 million stadium opened on February 19, 1989, with a double header sweep of Cumberland University.  The actual stadium sits on city property off-campus and was built by the City of Oxford, using a 2% Local Tourism Tax on prepared food and alcohol to pay for it.

Features

Right field terrace

The hill beyond the right field wall was equipped with a seating area in 1993 that sits comfortably between the field and eight tennis courts. This has historically been a section for students.  Since the 2000 season the area has undergone many improvements. What began as a gathering place for about 100 students has grown into an area of about 1,000 students per game during conference season. This area however is not counted as part of the stadium.

Right field traditions 
1.) One of the main right field traditions involves the players themselves. After warmups are completed, each inning the outfielders throw the baseball into the right field student section where students write messages on them and then throw the ball back to the outfielders for warm ups the next inning.2.) The beer shower: Upon an Ole Miss home run or walk off win, the student section jumps to their feet and throws their beverage into the air.

Left field terrace

For many years there was nothing but trees and a parking lot beyond the left field wall.  In 2006, the left field area, known as Oakes Pavilion, was renovated with a new scoreboard equipped with a large video board and the seating areas were upgraded with grills, picnic tables, and a play area for children.  The left field area can hold around 1,000 fans and has become one of the more popular areas of the field. It is mainly reserved for the families and non-students.

Stadium amenities

Below the stands are coach's offices, locker rooms, player's lounge, press area, and a workout area for the pitchers.  Along the first base line is a  hitting complex.  In 2006 a large video board was added that supplies fans with replays during the game.

Expansion
In April 2007, Ole Miss announced that their baseball stadium would undergo an $18.5 million expansion. The expansion was mostly completed in time for the 2009 baseball season. The expansion resulted in an increase of the overall number of seats to just over 6,000 and a total capacity exceeding 8,500.  The architect for both the original facility and the expansion was Cooke Douglass Farr Lemons.  On June 6, 2009, an Ole Miss record 10,323 were present to watch the Super Regional game vs the University of Virginia (UVA won 4–3).

Attendance

The first Ole Miss game with more than 10,000 fans (10,323) in attendance occurred on June 6, 2009, against Virginia in Super Regional play.

On April 28, 2018, a new attendance record, 12,152, was set on Double Decker Weekend in a game against LSU, which then No.6 Ole Miss won 9–8. This record fell in 2022 during the final game of the Rebels' home series against archrival Mississippi State, when a crowd of 12,503 saw the Rebels fall 7–6 in 11 innings.

In 2013, the Rebels ranked 3rd among Division I baseball programs in attendance, averaging 7,996 per home game.

In 2015, 2016, & 2017, the Rebels ranked 2nd among Division I baseball programs in per game attendance, averaging 8,028, 8,619, & 9,238 per home game, respectively.

Stadium attendance in excess of 11,000

See also

 List of NCAA Division I baseball venues

References

College baseball venues in the United States
Baseball venues in Mississippi
Buildings and structures in Lafayette County, Mississippi
Ole Miss Rebels baseball
1988 establishments in Mississippi
Sports venues completed in 1988